Timothy Dwyer (born 31 May 1963) is an Australian former professional rugby league footballer who played for the Manly Sea Eagles and Eastern Suburbs, and for Barrow and Fulham RLFC in England.

Dwyer, a fullback, played his junior rugby league for the Caloundra Sharks. He is the son of a former mayor of Caloundra City Council, Des Dwyer.

In the 1988 NSWRL season, Dwyer featured in 12 premiership games for Manly. His season ended in round 20 when he had his jaw broken in an accidental collision with Ellery Hanley while under a high kick. Despite the injury he played out the remaining 30 minutes of the game, setting up a try to Matt Burke which proved the difference between the teams.

Dwyer played first-grade for Eastern Suburbs in 1989 and 1990, making eight and six appearances respectively. Following his second season at Eastern Suburbs he had a stint in England with Fulham.

Since 2000 he has served as a councillor for Sunshine Coast Council and as of 2019 is Deputy Mayor.

References

External links
Tim Dwyer at Rugby League Project

1963 births
Living people
Australian rugby league players
London Broncos players
Manly Warringah Sea Eagles players
Rugby league fullbacks
Rugby league players from Nambour, Queensland
Sydney Roosters players